Raúl Arévalo Zorzo (born 22 November 1979) is a Spanish actor and director, known by international audiences for his role in the film Summer Rain, directed by Antonio Banderas.

Career
Raúl Arévalo Zorzo was born on 22 November 1979 in Móstoles, province of Madrid. Arévalo began his acting career in 2001 performing the role of Carlos in the Spanish TV series Compañeros for two seasons, until 2002.

In 2003, he made his film debut in Los abajo firmantes, starring alongside Javier Cámara and Juan Diego Botto. The following year, he appeared in Cosas que hacen que la vida valga la pena, directed by Manuel Gómez Pereira.

Between 2003 and 2005, he made appearances in the TV series Hospital Central, Cuéntame cómo pasó, Aída and Motivos personales.

In 2006, he made his breakthrough performance as Israel/Sean, the lead character's best friend, in Dark Blue Almost Black (AzulOscuroCasiNegro), directed by Daniel Sánchez Arévalo. His work in this film earned him several awards. Later that year, he appeared on Antonio Banderas' second directorial effort Summer Rain (El Camino de los Ingleses), and in 2007 in the musical/comedy Scandalous (¿Por qué se frotan las patitas?) and Seven Billiard Tables (Siete mesas de billar francés), with Maribel Verdú. He also worked with Verdú in The Blind Sunflowers (Los girasoles ciegos) in 2008, and in 2009, he appeared in Sánchez Arévalo's latest film, Gordos. For his performance in this film, he won a Goya film Award for best supporting actor in 2009's edition.

In 2016, he made his directorial debut with the award-winning The Fury of a Patient Man, for which he won a Best New Director Goya film Award.

He has also appeared in several short films, including Traumalogy (Traumalogía, 2007), as well as many stage productions.

Filmography

Film

Television

References

External links
 

1979 births
21st-century Spanish male actors
Best Supporting Actor Goya Award winners
Living people
Male actors from the Community of Madrid
People from Móstoles
Spanish film directors
Spanish male film actors
Spanish male television actors